Nuclear receptor-interacting protein 1 (NRIP1) also known as receptor-interacting protein 140 (RIP140) is a protein that in humans is encoded by the NRIP1 gene.

Function 

Nuclear receptor interacting protein 1 (NRIP1) is a nuclear protein that specifically interacts with the hormone-dependent activation domain AF2 of nuclear receptors. Also known as RIP140, this protein is a key regulator which modulates transcriptional activity of a variety of transcription factors, including the estrogen receptor.

RIP140 has an important role in regulating lipid and glucose metabolism, and regulates gene expression in metabolic tissues including heart, skeletal muscle, and liver.  A major role for RIP140 in adipose tissue is to block the expression of genes involved in energy dissipation and mitochondrial uncoupling, including uncoupling protein 1 and carnitine palmitoyltransferase 1b.

Estrogen-related receptor alpha (ERRa) can activate RIP140 during adipogenesis, by means of directly binding to an estrogen receptor element/ERR element and indirectly through Sp1 binding to the proximal promoter.

RIP140 suppresses the expression of mitochondrial proteins succinate dehydrogenase complex b and CoxVb and acts as a negative regulator of glucose uptake in mice.

Knockout studies 

Knockout mice that completely lack the RIP140 molecule are lean and stay lean, even on a rich diet.

Knockout mice (females) are also infertile because they fail to ovulate. Failure of ovulation in these mice is caused by lack of cumulus expansion and altered expression of various genes, including amphiregulin, in ovarian follicles.

Clinical significance 

RIP140 is part of the chain by which tumors can cause cachexia.

Levels of RIP140 expression in various tissues varies during aging in mice, suggesting changes in metabolic function. RIP140 is implicated in certain human disease processes. In morbid obesity, RIP140 levels are down-regulated in visceral adipose tissue. In breast cancer, RIP140 is involved in regulation of E2F1, an oncogene which discriminates between luminal and basal types of tumours.  RIP140 has an influence upon cancer phenotype and prognosis. In addition, RIP140 has a role in inflammation, since it acts as a coactivator for NFkappaB/RelA-dependent cytokine gene expression. Lack of RIP140 leads to an inhibition of proinflammatory pathways in macrophages.

Interactions 

NRIP1 has been shown to interact with:

 AHR,
 CTBP1
 CTBP2,
 DAX1,
 HDAC5,
 NR1B1,
 NR2B1,
 NR3A1,
 NR3C1,
 NR5A1, and
 YWHAQ.

See also
 Transcription coregulator

References

Further reading

External links
 
 
 PDBe-KB provides an overview of all the structure information available in the PDB for Human Nuclear receptor-interacting protein 1 (NRIP1)

Gene expression
Transcription coregulators